Neptunomonas acidivorans is a Gram-negative, aerobic, rod-shaped and motile bacterium from the genus of Neptunomonas which has been isolated from sediment from the Daebu Island.

References

Oceanospirillales
Bacteria described in 2014